Washington University School of Medicine (WUSM) is the medical school of Washington University in St. Louis in St. Louis, Missouri.  Founded in 1891, the School of Medicine has 1,260 students, 604 of which are pursuing a medical degree with or without a combined Doctor of Philosophy or other advanced degree. It also offers doctorate degrees in biomedical research through the Division of Biology and Biological Sciences. The School has developed large physical therapy (273 students) and occupational therapy (233 students) programs, as well as the Program in Audiology and Communication Sciences (100 students) which includes a Doctor of Audiology (Au.D.) degree and a Master of Science in Deaf Education (M.S.D.E.) degree. There are 1,772 faculty, 1,022 residents, and 765 fellows.

The clinical service is provided by Washington University Physicians, a comprehensive medical and surgical practice providing treatment in more than 75 medical specialties. Washington University Physicians are the medical staff of the two teaching hospitals – Barnes-Jewish Hospital and St. Louis Children's Hospital.  They also provide inpatient and outpatient care at the St. Louis Veteran's Administration Hospital, hospitals in the BJC HealthCare system and 35 other office locations throughout the greater St Louis region.

U.S. News & World Report ranks the college high; the school is currently ranked 11th for research and has been ranked as high as 2nd in 2003 and 2004,. The school ranks first in the nation in student selectivity. As of 2019, it also receives the third most funding among all medical schools in the US from the National Institute of Health, totalling an amount of $218 million. Globally, the school is ranked as the 20th and 35th best medical program in 2020 by the Times Higher Education’s World University Rankings for medicine and QS World University Ranking for medicine, respectively.

Faculty
18 Nobel laureates have been associated with the School of Medicine.
12 faculty members are fellows of the National Academy of Sciences; 30 belong to the Institute of Medicine.
92 faculty members hold individual career development awards from the National Institutes of Health (NIH).
59 faculty members hold career development awards from non-federal agencies.
14 faculty members have MERIT status, a special recognition given by the National Institutes of Health that provides long-term, uninterrupted financial support to investigators.
Six faculty members are Howard Hughes Medical Institute investigators.

History 
Medical classes were first held at Washington University in 1891 after the St. Louis Medical College decided to affiliate with the University, establishing a Medical Department. Robert S. Brookings, a University benefactor from its earliest days, devoted much of his work and philanthropy to Washington University and made the improvement of the Medical Department one of his primary objectives. This especially became a cause for concern after an early 1900s Carnegie Foundation report derided the organization and quality of the Medical Department.

Following a trend in medical education across the country, research and the creation of new knowledge became a stated objective in a 1906 course catalog for the medical department. For Brookings and the University, incorporating the Medical Department into a separate School of Medicine seemed to be the next logical step. This process began in 1914 when facilities were moved to their current location in St. Louis's Central West End neighborhood in 1914, and was completed in 1918 with the official naming of the School of Medicine. The first female faculty member seems to have been biochemist and physiologist Ethel Ronzoni Bishop, who became an assistant professor in 1923.

The Medical School began its escalation from regional renown in the 1940s, a decade when two groups of faculty members received Nobel Prizes, in 1944 and 1947. In 1950, a Cancer Research Building was completed, the first major addition to the School of Medicine since its 1914 move and one of several buildings added in the decade. In the 1960s the School of Medicine diversified its student body, graduating its first African-American student and substantially increasing the percentage of graduating students who are female to nearly half.

In March 2020, Washington University School of Medicine announced the construction of a new $616 million, 11-story, 609,000-square-foot neuroscience research building which will sit at the eastern edge of the Medical Campus in the Cortex Innovation Community. Construction of the building is to finish in 2023.

Campus 

Washington University Medical Center comprises 164 acres (0.5 km²) spread over about 17 city blocks, located along the eastern edge of Forest Park within the Central West End neighborhood of St. Louis. Barnes-Jewish Hospital and St. Louis Children's Hospital, part of BJC HealthCare, the teaching hospitals affiliated with the School of Medicine, are also located within the medical complex. Many of the buildings are connected via sky bridges and corridors.

Washington University and BJC HealthCare have taken on many joint venture projects since their original collaboration in the 1910s. One is the Center for Advanced Medicine, which houses the Alvin J. Siteman Cancer Center and was completed in December 2001. At , it is one of the largest buildings in the complex.

The complex has several especially large buildings.  In 2007, construction began on the  BJC Institutes of Health, of which Washington University's Medical School occupies several floors. It is the largest building constructed on Washington University's campus. Called the BJC Institute of Health at Washington University, it houses the University's BioMed 21 Research Initiative, five interdisciplinary research centers, laboratories, and additional space for The Genome Center.

Prominent buildings, centers, and spaces at the medical campus includes Barnes-Jewish Hospital, the Central Institute for the Deaf, St. Louis Children's Hospital, Rehabilitation Institute of Saint Louis, Siteman Cancer Center, Center for Advanced Medicine, Charles F. Knight Emergency and Trauma Center, and the Eric P. Newman Education Center.

The complex is accessible via the Central West End MetroLink station, which provides transportation to the rest of Washington University's campuses.

Nobel laureates 

Physiology or Medicine

 1943: Edward A. Doisy (1893–1986), Faculty of Medicine, 1919–1923
 1944: Joseph Erlanger (1874–1965), Chairman, Department of Physiology 1910–1946
 1944: Herbert Gasser (1888–1963), Faculty of Medicine, 1916–1931
 1947: Carl F. Cori (1896–1984), Faculty of Medicine 1931–1984
 1947: Gerty T. Cori (1896–1957), Faculty of Medicine 1931–1957
 1959: Arthur Kornberg, Chairman, Department of Microbiology, 1952–1959
 1959: Severo Ochoa, Faculty of Medicine 1940–1942
 1969: Alfred Hershey (1908–1997), Faculty of Medicine 1934–1950
 1971: Earl Sutherland (1915–1974), M.D. 42, Resident in Internal Medicine 1943–1945, Faculty of Medicine, 1945–1953
 1974: Christian de Duve, Faculty of Medicine 1946–1947
 1978: Daniel Nathans (1928–1999), M.D. 54
 1978: Hamilton O. Smith, Washington University Medical Service 1956–1957
 1980: George D. Snell, Faculty of Arts and Sciences 1933–1934
 1986: Stanley Cohen, Faculty of Arts and Sciences 1953–1959
 1986: Rita Levi-Montalcini (1909–2012), Faculty of Arts and Sciences, 1948–1977
 1992: Edwin G. Krebs, M.D. 43, Resident in Internal Medicine and then a Research Fellow in Biological Chemistry 1945–1948
 1998: Robert F. Furchgott, Ph.D. Faculty of Medicine, 1949–1956
 2020: Charles M. Rice, Ph.D. Faculty of Medicine, 1986-2001
Chemistry

 1970: Luis F. Leloir, Faculty of Medicine 1944
 1980: Paul Berg, Faculty of Medicine 1954–1959
 2012: Brian Kobilka, Resident in Internal Medicine, 1981–1984

Notable alumni 
 Alexis F. Hartmann, MD '21; pediatrician, biochemist and former professor of pediatrics
 Ewald W. Busse, MD ’42; psychiatrist and dean of Duke University School of medicine
 Earl Sutherland, MD '42; biochemist and winner of the Nobel Prize in Physiology or Medicine
 Edwin G. Krebs, MD ’43; biochemist and winner of the Nobel Prize in Physiology or Medicine
 David W. Talmage, MD ’44; immunologist
 Helen Elizabeth Nash, MD, PhD '45; pediatrician; dean of minority affairs at Washington University School of Medicine
 Ernst Wynder, MD '50; linked smoking with lung cancer 
 Daniel Nathans, MD ’54; microbiologist and winner of the Nobel Prize in Physiology or Medicine and National Medal of Science
 James E. Darnell Jr., MD ’55; molecular biologist and winner of the National Medal of Science
 Selna Kaplan, MD ’55; pediatric endocrinologist
 Thomas Hornbein, MD ’56; mountaineer and chairman of anesthesiology at University of Washington School of Medicine
 Clay Armstrong, MD ’60; physiologist and winner of the Albert Lasker Award for Basic Medical Research for describing K+ channels
 Floyd E. Bloom, MD ’60; chairman emeritus of neuropharmacology at Scripps Research Institute and editor-in-chief of Science
 Pedro Cuatrecasas, MD ’62; inventor of affinity chromatography and winner of the Wolf Prize in Medicine
 C. Garrison Fathman, MD ’69; clinical immunologist
 Philip O. Alderson, MD ’70; dean of Saint Louis University School of Medicine
 Jonathan Mann, MD ’74; head of the World Health Organization global AIDS program
 Dan R. Littman, MD, PhD ’80; immunologist, HHMI investigator, member of the National Academy of Sciences and the Institute of Medicine
 Eric D. Green, MD, PhD ’87, HS ’91; director of the NHGRI

Other associated hospitals 
 St. Louis Children's Hospital
 Alvin J. Siteman Cancer Center
 Barnes-Jewish West County Hospital
 Barnes-Jewish St. Peters Hospital
 Christian Hospital
 Northwest HealthCare
 Metropolitan St. Louis Psychiatric Center
 Missouri Baptist Medical Center
 St. Louis Shriner's Hospital

See also
Washington Manual of Medical Therapeutics

References

External links
 

Medical schools in Missouri
School of Medicine
Educational institutions established in 1891
Washington University in St. Louis campus
1891 establishments in Missouri
Central West End, St. Louis